Antiques Roadshow is a British television series produced by the BBC since 1979. Series 26 (2003/04) comprised 25 editions that were broadcast by the BBC from  7 September 2003 –   March 2004

The dates in brackets given below are the dates each episode was filmed at the location. The date not in brackets is the episode's first UK airing date on BBC One.

References

External links
 Official Website – BBC Antiques Roadshow
 Homes and Antiques, Meet the Experts
 BBC Proposed Episode Filming Locations
 Episode list – TV.com
 Episode list (from series 17) – bbcprograms.com
 Filming Dates – BBC Homes and Antiques
 BBC Restoration Roadshow

26